Diane Kelly may refer to:

 Diane Kelly (novelist), author of humorous, romantic mystery novels
 Diane Kelly (microbiologist), professor of microbiology
 Diane Kelly (computer scientist), American computer scientist